Johannes Frederick 'Jacques' Vermeulen (born 8 February 1995) is a South African rugby union player for the Exeter Chiefs in the Gallagher Premiership. His regular position is flanker but he can also play as a lock or number 8.

Career

2008–13

Vermeulen represented Western Province from as early as primary school level, when he played at the Under-13 Craven Week competition in 2008. In 2011, he was included in their Under-16 squad that played at the Grant Khomo week before playing in the premier high school rugby union competition in South Africa, the Under-18 Craven Week in both 2012 and 2013, starting all three of their matches in both competitions and scoring one try in their 2013 match against the Golden Lions.

After the 2013 competition, Vermeulen was included in the South African Schools side. He started their matches against England and Wales and played off the bench against France, helping South Africa to victories in all three matches.

2014

Despite not initially being included in the South Africa Under-20 squad for the 2014 IRB Junior World Championship, an injury to Dan du Preez led to Vermeulen being called up. He started their 61–5 victory over Scotland in their opening match of the competition, but didn't feature in their next match against hosts New Zealand, where South Africa achieved a 33–24 win. He returned to the starting line-up for their final pool match against Samoa and also started their 32–25 victory against New Zealand in the semi-final. He made his fourth start of the competition in the final against England, but could not prevent South Africa from losing the match 20–21 to finish the competition as runners-up.

Vermeulen returned to domestic action to represent the s in the 2014 Under-21 Provincial Championship, despite still being eligible for their Under=19 side. He started five of their matches in the competition, with the side making it all the way to the final of the competition before losing 10–20 to the s.

2015

Vermeulen was included in the  squad for the 2015 Vodacom Cup competition.

Vermeulen was named in a 37-man training squad for the South Africa national under-20 rugby union team and subsequently included in the squad that embarked on a two-match tour of Argentina. He started their 25–22 victory over Argentina in the first match, but didn't feature in their 39–28 victory a few days later.

Upon the team's return, Vermeulen was named in the final squad for the 2015 World Rugby Under 20 Championship. He didn't play in the first of their three matches in Pool B of the competition, a 33–5 win against hosts Italy, but came on as a replacement in their 40–8 win against Samoa in the second match. He started their final group match against Australia, scoring a try in the second minute of the match to help South Africa to a 46–13 win which saw South Africa finish top of Pool B to qualify for the semi-finals with the best record pool stage of all the teams in the competition. Vermeulen didn't feature in their semi-final match against England, which saw them lose 20–28 to be eliminated from the competition by England for the second year in succession but he did start their third-place play-off match against France, helping South Africa to a 31–18 win to secure third place in the competition.

References

South African rugby union players
Living people
1995 births
Sportspeople from Paarl
Rugby union locks
Rugby union flankers
Western Province (rugby union) players
South Africa Under-20 international rugby union players
Rugby union players from the Western Cape